Saint-Michel-de-Maurienne (literally Saint-Michel of Maurienne) is a commune in the Savoie department in the Auvergne-Rhône-Alpes region in south-eastern France.

Geography

Climate

Saint-Michel-de-Maurienne has a oceanic climate (Köppen climate classification Cfb). It is quite common to exceed  in summer, sometimes the maximum temperature can reach , and in winter it is relatively rare to fall below .

See also
Communes of the Savoie department
The 1917 Saint-Michel-de-Maurienne derailment, which killed several hundred French troops.
Château de Saint-Michel-de-Maurienne

References

External links

Official site

 
Communes of Savoie
Graioceli